Edgar Hovhannisyan, Hovhannisian or Oganesian (January 14, 1930, Yerevan – December 28, 1998, Yerevan) was an Armenian composer, Professor of Composition at the Yerevan State Conservatory, People's Artist of the USSR (1986).

He finished the Yerevan State Conservatory in 1953, then pursued post-graduate work at the Moscow Conservatory, where he worked under famed Armenian composer Aram Khachaturian. He was the director of the State Opera and Ballet Theater in Yerevan in 1962–1968.

Hovhannisyan is widely considered among the most influential Armenian composers of the 20th century. He is the author of ballets, including "Janna D'Ark", "Sulamif", and "Marmar". He also experimented with various musical styles, including neo-classical, folk-based styles, and even jazz — such as in the "Concert Variations for Saxophone and Jazz Orchestra", opera ("The Travel to Arzrum"), various vocal-orchestral works (e.g. the oratorio "Grikor Naregatsi", the hymn of Yerevan), and numerous film scores.

Awards
State Prize of the USSR (1979),
State Prize of Armenian SSR (1967).

Filmography
Huso astgh (1978)
Aprum er mi mard (1968)
Patvi hamar (1956)

Sources
Biography
Biography (in Russian)
Hovhannisyan at IMDB

1930 births
1998 deaths
Musicians from Yerevan
Armenian composers
20th-century composers
Male composers
Moscow Conservatory alumni
20th-century male musicians
Armenian ballet composers